The Ministry of Education and Science is a ministry of the Government of the Republic of North Macedonia, by virtue of section 23 of the Law of Organization and Acting of the Organs of State's Administration (Law Gazette of Republic of Macedonia no. 59/2000 from 21. July 2000). The Ministry does the work concerning:

upbringing and/or education of any type or degree
organization, financing, development and upgrading of the upbringing, education and science
upbringing and education of Macedonian workers' children in foreign countries
verification of different professions and/or profiles in the field of education
pupils' and students' standards
technological advances, IT, information systems, and technical culture
international scientific and/or technical collaboration, etc.

As sectors of the Ministry, exist the following institutions:

Pedagogical Services Office
Bureau for Development of the Education
Authority for development and upgrading the education in the ethnicities' tongues
National Educational Inspectorate

Ministers

References

Government of North Macedonia
Education ministries
Science and technology ministries
Government agencies established in 1991
1991 establishments in the Republic of Macedonia